The 2018–19 Appalachian State Mountaineers women's basketball team represented Appalachian State University in the 2018–19 NCAA Division I women's basketball season. The Mountaineers, led by fifth year head coach Angel Elderkin, played their home games at George M. Holmes Convocation Center and were members of the Sun Belt Conference. They finished the season 22–14, 10–8 in Sun Belt play to finish in fifth place. They advanced to the semifinals of the Sun Belt women's tournament where they lost to Little Rock. They received an invitation to the WBI where they defeated UNC Asheville, Marshall, Campbell and North Texas to win the WBI championship.

Roster

Schedule

|-
!colspan=9 style=| Exhibition

|-
!colspan=9 style=| Non-conference regular season

|-
!colspan=9 style=| Sun Belt regular season

|-
!colspan=9 style=| Sun Belt Women's Tournament

|-
!colspan=9 style=| WBI

See also
 2018–19 Appalachian State Mountaineers men's basketball team

References

Appalachian State
Appalachian State Mountaineers women's basketball seasons
Appalachian
Appalachian
Appalachian